Henrik Furebotn (born 11 February 1986) is a former Norwegian footballer midfielder.

Club career
He was capped for Norway as a youth international. He signed for Sogndal prior to the 2006 season, having previously played for Årdal in the Second Division. He made his first team debut against Pors in the first round of Adeccoligaen in 2006 on 9 April 2006. His debut in Tippeligaen came on 20 March 2010 against Strømsgodset in the first round of Tippeligaen in 2010. Before the start of the 2015 season, he joined Bodø/Glimt, rejoining Sogndal in 2016. In 2018 Furebotn decided to retire from football.

Career statistics

References

1986 births
Living people
People from Årdal
Norway youth international footballers
Norwegian footballers
Årdal FK players
Sogndal Fotball players
Sandnes Ulf players
FK Bodø/Glimt players
Fredrikstad FK players
Norwegian First Division players
Eliteserien players
Association football midfielders
Sportspeople from Vestland